The Julier Pass (Romansh: Pass dal Güglia, German: Julierpass, Italian Passo del Giulia) (el. 2284 m) is a mountain pass in Switzerland, in the Albula Alps. It connects the Engadin valley with central Graubünden, the nearest inhabited localities on its approaches being Silvaplana and Bivio. At its summit, the pass crosses the watershed / drainage divide between the basins of the Rivers Rhine and Danube. The Julier Pass lies between Piz Lagrev and Piz Julier. A few metres south of the summit is the small lake Lej da las Culuonnas.

Remains of a Roman temple and cart tracks were found and illustrate its importance in Roman times.

The road constructed in the 1820s to replace the old Septimer Pass was well built and is still easily passable after moderate widening for normal cars and trucks.  In some parts, areas were rebuilt in 2009 to reduce the number of serpentine turns. Winter use requires winter tires, as well as snow chains in extremely poor weather.

The Julier Pass is one of the three paved road passes connecting the Engadin with the northern Grisons, the two other being the Albula Pass and the Flüela Pass.

Route

See also
Maloja Pass and Septimer Pass, two passes in close proximity of the Julier Pass
List of highest paved roads in Switzerland
List of highest road passes in Switzerland

References

External links 

Profile on climbbybike.com

Mountain passes of Switzerland
Mountain passes of the Alps
Engadin
Mountain passes of Graubünden
Surses